Otemae University is a liberal arts oriented school that began in 1946.  It is in the Kansai region of Japan and has three campuses: one in Itami, one in Osaka, and a co-educational university in Nishinomiya.  The school has research institutes in history and intercultural studies.  The Nishinomiya campus features a traditional Japanese teahouse.

Study abroad programs are offered by the school to Canada, China, South Korea, the United Kingdom, and the United States.

External links

 Official Site

Private universities and colleges in Japan
Universities and colleges in Hyōgo Prefecture
Otemae University
Nishinomiya